The 1st Critics' Choice Movie Awards were presented on January 22, 1996, honoring the finest achievements of 1995 filmmaking.

Winners

 Best Actor:
 Kevin Bacon – Murder in the First
 Best Actress:
 Nicole Kidman – To Die For
 Best Director:
 Mel Gibson – Braveheart
 Best Documentary:
 Crumb
 Best Foreign Language Film:
 Il Postino: The Postman (Il postino) • Belgium / France / Italy
 Best Picture:
 Sense and Sensibility
 Best Screenplay:
 Sense and Sensibility – Emma Thompson
 Best Special Family Film Award:
 Babe
 Best Supporting Actor:
 Ed Harris – Apollo 13, Just Cause, and Nixon (TIE)
 Kevin Spacey – Outbreak, Se7en, Swimming with Sharks, and The Usual Suspects (TIE)
 Best Supporting Actress:
 Mira Sorvino – Mighty Aphrodite

References

Broadcast Film Critics Association Awards
1995 film awards